Olive Blakeney (August 21, 1894 October 21, 1959) was an American actress.

Early years
Blakeney was born in Kentucky and attended the Cincinnati School of Expression.

Career
Blakeney played as a super in visiting stage shows at $1 per performance. She made her screen debut in England in 1932.

In the early 1910s, Blakeney acted with the Pittsfield (Massachusetts) Stock Company. In 1914, she was engaged with the Lucille La Verne stock theater company. After working as William Gaxton's partner in vaudeville, she acted on stage in England. While there, she helped to introduce the play Broadway to British audiences. Her Broadway credits include The Royal Family (1951) and The Browning Version / Harlequinade (1949).

Blakeney portrayed the mother of Henry Aldrich in seven consecutive films about The Aldrich Family.

On television, Blakeney played the housekeeper in the syndicated medical drama Dr. Hudson's Secret Journal (1955-1956) and guest-starred in "The Mothers," a 1957 episode of the CBS situation comedy Mr. Adams and Eve.

Personal life
Blakeney was married to Bernard Nedell and was the mother of Betty Lou Lydon and mother-in-law of Jimmy Lydon, who played her son in all but the first of the Henry Aldrich films.

Blakeney died at the age of 65 due to complications of cancer on October 21, 1959, in Encino, California. She was cremated and interred at Forest Lawn Memorial Park, Glendale in California.

Partial filmography

Her Imaginary Lover (1933) - Polly
Give Her a Ring (1934) - Mrs. Brune
Leave It to Blanche (1934) - Blanche Wetherby
Butter and Egg Man (1934)
Mr. What's-His-Name? (1935) - Ann Henfield
Hello, Sweetheart (1935) - Daisy Montrose
Come Out of the Pantry (1935) - Mrs. Beach-Howard
Excuse My Glove (1936) - Aunt Fanny Stafford
Two's Company (1936) - Mrs. Madison
Three Maxims (1936) - Mrs. Winston
Don't Get Me Wrong (1937) - Frankie
Gangway (1937) - Nedda Beaumont
Third Finger, Left Hand (1940) - Louise (uncredited)
That Uncertain Feeling (1941) - Margie
Billy the Kid (1941) - Mrs. Patterson
Dr. Kildare's Wedding Day (1941) - Mrs. Worth (uncredited)
Two-Faced Woman (1941) - Phyllis (uncredited)
Glamour Boy (1941) - Miss Treat
Henry and Dizzy (1942) - Mrs. Aldrich
Are Husbands Necessary? (1942) - Miss Bumstead
The Postman Didn't Ring (1942) - Secretary (uncredited)
Henry Aldrich, Editor (1942) - Mrs. Alice Aldrich
Random Harvest (1942) - Miss Barnes (uncredited)
Aerial Gunner (1943) - Mrs. Sanford Lunt
Henry Aldrich Gets Glamour (1943) - Mrs. Alice Aldrich
Henry Aldrich Swings It (1943) - Mrs. Alice Aldrich
Henry Aldrich Haunts a House (1943) - Mrs. Alice Aldrich
Henry Aldrich, Boy Scout (1944) - Mrs. Alice Aldrich
The Navy Way (1944) - Mrs. Will Jamison (uncredited)
Henry Aldrich Plays Cupid (1944) - Mrs. Alice Aldrich
Henry Aldrich's Little Secret (1944) - Mrs. Alice Aldrich
Allergic to Love (1944) - Mrs. Bradley
The Port of 40 Thieves (1944) - Aunt Caroline Hubbard
Experiment Perilous (1944) - Cissie
Nob Hill (1945) - Carruthers' Housekeeper (uncredited)
Dakota (1945) - Mrs. Stowe
Leave Her to Heaven (1945) - Mrs. Louise Robie (uncredited)
Sentimental Journey (1946) - Mrs. Deane (uncredited)
The Strange Woman (1946) - Mrs. Hollis
Time Out of Mind (1947) - Mrs. Fernald
Sealed Verdict (1948) - Camilla Cameron
Roogie's Bump (1954) - Mrs. Andrews
Three Brave Men (1956) - Miss Victoria Scott
The Green-Eyed Blonde (1957) - Miss Vandingham
I Want to Live! (1958) - Corona Warden (uncredited)
Auntie Mame (1958) - Dowager (uncredited)

References

External links

 

1959 deaths
1894 births
American film actresses
Burials at Forest Lawn Memorial Park (Glendale)
20th-century American actresses
People from Newport, Kentucky
Actresses from Kentucky
American stage actresses
American expatriate actresses in the United Kingdom